Raul Mitra is a Filipino composer, arranger, songwriter, musical director, pianist, and keyboardist. He is the son of former House Speaker Ramon V. Mitra.

Awards

References

External links
 

Filipino film score composers
Filipino songwriters
Living people
Musicians from Manila
People from Puerto Princesa
Year of birth missing (living people)